Street Full of Surprises is a 1957 Soviet comedy film directed by Sergei Sidelyov.

Plot 
The film takes place in Leningrad. Chief Accountant, Smirnov, being in the booth of the traffic controller, violates traffic rules. But guard is brought to the police station instead of him Vodnev, the cashier of Stroytrest, the father of his beloved girl. The guard does admit that he was wrong, but he does not apologize. But, nevertheless, he will soon have a chance to fulfill his duty.

Cast 
 Leonid Kharitonov as Vasiliy Shaneshkin
 Vsevolod Larionov as Vladimir Zvantsev 
 Georgi Chernovolenko as Ivan Zakharovich Vodnyev  
 Yakov Rodos as Porfiriy Perovich Smirnov-Aliansky  
 Jemma Osmolovskaya as Katya 
 Vera Karpova as Liza  
 Olga Porudolinskaya as Nadezhda Pavlovna  
 Tamara Yevgenyeva-Ivanova as Mariya Mikhaylovna  
 Yevgeny  Leonov as Yevgeny Pavlovich Serdyukov  
 Georgi Semyonov as Yegorov 
 Sasha Soboleva as lost girl
 Lyudmila Makarova as lost girl's mother

References

External links 
 
 Street Full of Surprises on Kinopoisk

1957 films
1950s Russian-language films
Soviet comedy films
1957 comedy films
Lenfilm films
1950s police films
Films set in Saint Petersburg